Traffic Light is an American sitcom television series that ran on Fox from February 8, 2011 to May 31, 2011. It is based on the Israeli television series Ramzor (lit. "traffic light"; by Keshet Broadcasting Ltd.), and was adapted to an American audience by Bob Fisher. The series aired Tuesdays at 9:30 pm following Raising Hope as a mid-season replacement for Running Wilde. 
On May 10, 2011, Fox cancelled the series after 1 season.

Premise
Traffic Light revolves around three best friends since college, Mike, Adam, Ethan, who are now in their thirties. Each man finds himself in a different stage of life. Ethan is perpetually single, while Adam just moved in with his girlfriend, and Mike is married and has a son. The series follows the group as they try to balance their friendship with the different demands in each of their romantic relationships. The series is set in Chicago but was filmed in Los Angeles.

Cast

Main
 David Denman as Mike Reilly
 Nelson Franklin as Adam
 Kris Marshall as Ethan Wright
 Liza Lapira as Lisa Reilly
 Aya Cash as Callie

Recurring
 Rob Huebel as Kev
 Janina Gavankar as Alexa
 Kathryn Hahn as Kate
 Blake Anderson as Tad

Episodes

Broadcast 
In Italy, the series aired on Fox Italy.

References

External links
 

2010s American single-camera sitcoms
2011 American television series debuts
2011 American television series endings